Juan Bidegaray (31 December 1919 – 9 January 2010) was a Uruguayan sailor. He competed in the Swallow event at the 1948 Summer Olympics.

References

External links
 

1919 births
2010 deaths
Uruguayan male sailors (sport)
Olympic sailors of Uruguay
Sailors at the 1948 Summer Olympics – Swallow
Sportspeople from Montevideo